The commune of Gashikanwa is a commune of Ngozi Province in northern Burundi. The capital lies at Gashikanwa.

References

Communes of Burundi
Ngozi Province